The Bank of Hampton is a historic bank building located at Hampton, Hampton County, South Carolina.

Description and history 
It was built in 1891–1892, and is a two-story Italianate-influenced brick building. The building features segmental arches over door and window openings, and low flat parapets at the side elevations. The Bank of Hampton operated until 1926. From the 1930s to the 1960s the building was operated as rental commercial space, with upstairs law offices.

Since 1987, the building has housed the Hampton Museum and Visitors’ Center.

It was listed on the National Register of Historic Places on May 30, 2001.

References

External links

Hampton Museum and Visitors’ Center - official site

Bank buildings on the National Register of Historic Places in South Carolina
Commercial buildings completed in 1892
Italianate architecture in South Carolina
National Register of Historic Places in Hampton County, South Carolina
Buildings and structures in Hampton County, South Carolina
Museums in Hampton County, South Carolina